Yakov Moiseyevich Urinson (born September 12, 1944, Moscow) is a Russian politician of Jewish descent, economist and Russian Deputy Prime Minister, Minister of the Russian economy in 1997–1998, Member of the Presidium of the Russian Jewish Congress.

References

External links
 Эхо Москвы 
   Методы и модели АСПР: итоги и перспективы. (коллективная монография). — М.: Экономика, 1989. — 

1944 births
Economists from Moscow
Living people
Politicians from Moscow
Economy ministers of Russia
Russian Jews
Plekhanov Russian University of Economics alumni
Academic staff of the Higher School of Economics
Deputy heads of government of the Russian Federation